L'esprit de l'escalier or  is a French term used in English for the predicament of thinking of the perfect reply too late.

Origin

This name for the phenomenon comes from French encyclopedist and philosopher Denis Diderot's description of such a situation in his Paradoxe sur le comédien ("Paradox on the Comedian"). During a dinner at the home of statesman Jacques Necker, a remark was made to Diderot which left him speechless at the time, because, he explains, "a sensitive man, such as myself, overwhelmed by the argument levelled against him, becomes confused and doesn't come to himself again until at the bottom of the stairs" ("").

To have reached the bottom of the stairs means to have definitively left the gathering.

In other languages
However, in contemporary German  has an additional meaning: it refers to events or facts that seem to contradict their own background or context.

In Russian language, the notion is close to the native Russian saying "задним умом крепки" (zadnim umom krepki, "Our hindsight is strong"). The French expression is also in use in French.

English speakers sometimes call this "escalator wit", or "staircase wit".

See also
Comic timing
Epimetheus
"The Comeback" (Seinfeld)
Hindsight

References

External links 
 
 

French words and phrases
Figures of speech
Quotations from literature
Quotations from philosophy
1770s neologisms